Tony Hawk's Pro Skater 3 is a 2001 skateboarding video game and the third installment in the Tony Hawk's series. It was developed by Neversoft and published by Activision under the Activision O2 label in 2001 for the PlayStation, PlayStation 2, Game Boy Color and GameCube. In 2002, it was published for the Xbox, Game Boy Advance, Microsoft Windows, Nintendo 64 (becoming the last game ever released on the console as it had been discontinued 3 1/2 months prior), and Mac OS. It was the first game released for the PlayStation 2 supporting online play and was a launch title for the GameCube in North America.

Tony Hawk's Pro Skater 3 received critical acclaim, with the PlayStation 2 version being tied for highest-rated PlayStation 2 game on Metacritic alongside Grand Theft Auto III. With the PlayStation 2 version selling over 2.1 million copies in the United States by July 2006. Pro Skater 3 is also considered to be one of the greatest video games ever made.

Gameplay

Tony Hawk's Pro Skater 3 saw the introduction of the revert, a trick that enabled vert combos to be tied together with a manual, by tapping a button when landing in a quarterpipe; it allows for much longer combos than in the previous two games, where landing in a quarterpipe would finish a combo. It also added hidden combos. These were variations on standard tricks that could be performed as grab, flip, lip, or grind tricks. For example, double-tapping the kickflip button would make the character perform a double kickflip. This system would later be refined in Pro Skater 4.

The game stood out in the franchise for being the first title to have online capabilities. Users could connect directly to other players online on the PlayStation 2 version—even prior to the launch of the network adapter, with a USB Ethernet adapter. Due to the shut down of most Sony servers the game is no longer playable with others online, except for via programs like XLink Kai or through websites that allow users to play online through a DNS. The PlayStation and Nintendo 64 versions run on the Pro Skater 2 engine, with a different revert animation that is the same as the PlayStation version of Pro Skater 4.

The game features thirteen professional skateboarders, along with several unlockable original characters, depending on the version. Furthermore, the game features Darth Maul, Doomguy and Wolverine via licensing deals, as well as extreme sports athletes Shaun Palmer and Kelly Slater. Additionally, the Japanese and other Asian versions featured three Japanese pro skaters.

In both the Nintendo 64 and PlayStation versions, the wooden sides on the board (around the grip tape) has colors (except Bam Margera, Jamie Thomas, and the custom skater's decks), and the game has new tricks such as the Cannonball, Wrap Around, Fingerflip, Del Mar Indy and a new animation for the Airwalk. The Xbox version has an improved frame rate over the PlayStation 2 and GameCube version, as well as an additional level, the Oil Rig.

Reception
Chester Barber reviewed the PlayStation 2 version of the game for Next Generation, rating it five stars out of five, and stated, "PS2's most impressive game to date. Not just perfectly balanced – THPS3 offers enough new elements to warrant the coveted fifth star reserved for revolutionary titles".

By July 2006, the PlayStation 2 version of Tony Hawk's Pro Skater 3 had sold 2.1 million copies and earned $77 million in the United States. Next Generation ranked it as the 14th highest-selling game launched for the PlayStation 2, Xbox or GameCube between January 2000 and July 2006 in the country. Combined sales of Tony Hawk console games released in the 2000s reached 10.7 million units in the U.S. by July 2006. Its PlayStation 2 version also received a "Platinum" sales award from the British Entertainment and Leisure Software Publishers Association (ELSPA), indicating sales of at least 300,000 copies in the country.

The PS2 version earned a rare perfect 10 score from Jeff Gerstmann of GameSpot (one of only 20 titles to earn this award in GameSpot's history), who stated that the game "makes everything before it almost unplayable by comparison". GameSpot named Tony Hawk's Pro Skater 3 the best PlayStation game, best alternative sports console game and overall second-best console game of 2001. It was also nominated for the publication's annual "Best GameCube Game" and "Best PlayStation 2 Game" awards. It was also awarded the best sports game award at E3 2001. IGN rated the game 9.7/10, stating that the game "should go down in history as one of the best twitch-fests on PlayStation 2. Yes, Tony Hawk 3 is that good. The perfect skating game remains a small distance out of reach, but if you are not satisfied with your purchase of this game, head examinations are recommended". The game is currently the top rated PS2 game on the review aggregate website Metacritic, with an average score of 97/100, tying with Grand Theft Auto III. Famitsu gave the game a 30/40.

Tony Hawk's Pro Skater 3 was a runner-up for GameSpots 2002 "Best Sports Game on PC" award, which went to Madden NFL 2003. It won the publication's 2002 "Best Sports Game on Game Boy Advance" award, and was a runner-up for "Game of the Year on Game Boy Advance".

Awards
E3 2001 Game Critics Awards: Best Sports Game
2002 Interactive Achievement Awards: Best Sports Console Game

Sequel

A fourth game in the series, titled Pro Skater 4, was released the following year in October 2002.

Notes

References

External links

2001 video games
Activision games
Aspyr games
Beenox games
Game Boy Advance games
Game Boy Color games
GameCube games
Gearbox Software games
Interactive Achievement Award winners
Classic Mac OS games
MacOS games
Multiplayer and single-player video games
Neversoft games
Nintendo 64 games
PlayStation (console) games
PlayStation 2 games
RenderWare games
Skateboarding video games
Pro Skater 3
Vicarious Visions games
Video game sequels
Video games developed in Canada
Video games developed in the United Kingdom
Video games scored by Allister Brimble
Video games set in Brazil
Video games set in Canada
Video games set in Japan
Video games set in Los Angeles
Video games set in Tokyo
Video games set in the United States
Video games with custom soundtrack support
Windows games
Xbox games
D.I.C.E. Award for Sports Game of the Year winners
Video games developed in the United States
HotGen games